The United States Open for Arena Soccer is a cup-style tournament for all Major Arena Soccer League, MASL2, MASL3 and Premier Arena Soccer League teams. Established in 2008, the PASL announced they would hold the first tournament for indoor soccer open to all leagues and/or existing teams.

Champions

† Also PASL Ron Newman Cup Championship

References

External links
US Arena Open Cup official website

 
Indoor soccer competitions
Soccer cup competitions in the United States